C. Dass (7 June 1922 – 20 January 2001) was an Indian politician of the Indian National Congress. He was member of the 3rd Lok Sabha (1962–1967) and the 4th Lok Sabha (1967–1970), from Tirupati. Dass was also a member of the Tirumala Tirupati Devasthanams from 1963 to 1966. He was predeceased by his wife, with whom he had three sons and two daughters. Dass died on 20 January 2001, at the age of 78.

Positions held
1942–1952: Congress worker and Organiser, Charkha Sangham, Madanapalli.
1942: Took part in the 1942 Quit India movement and suffered imprisonment
1947: Took part in the liberation struggle of Mysore and led the second batch of Satyagrahis from Chittoor District 
General Secretary, Scheduled Castes and Scheduled Tribes Association, Madanapalli
Member,
Panchayat Samiti, Madanapalli
Zilla Parishad, Chittoor
Andhra Pradesh Ryot-Kooli Sangham
Committee on eradication of untouchability and Economic and Educational Uplift of the Scheduled Castes, Government of India
Central Harijan Board, Government of India
1963–1966: Member, T.T. Devasthanam, Tirupati
1962–1967: Member, Third Lok Sabha
1967–1971: Member, Fourth Lok Sabha

References

1922 births
2001 deaths
India MPs 1962–1967
India MPs 1967–1970
Indian National Congress politicians from Andhra Pradesh
Lok Sabha members from Andhra Pradesh
People from Tirupati
Telugu politicians